Unforgettable Places to See Before You Die is a travel book written and photographed by Steve Davey, with additional photography by Marc Schlossman. It features 40 sites, including both places of natural beauty and historical importance all over the world, and in all but one of the continents. (Europe: 7, Asia: 14, Australasia and Oceania: 3, Africa: 6, North America: 5, South America: 5). The United States of America, India and China are the most featured countries with a total of three sites featured each. It is notable for including the best of places in various categories, e.g. the world's greatest desert, rainforest, tropical island etc.

The list 
 Angkor Wat, Cambodia
 St Petersburg, Russia
 Havana, Cuba
 Wat Phra Kaeo, Bangkok, Thailand
 Grand Canyon, Arizona, USA
 Taj Mahal, Agra, India
 Eilean Donan Castle, Scotland, United Kingdom
 The Alhambra, Granada, Spain
 Aitutaki, Cook Islands
 Pyramid of Kukulcán, Mexico
 Venice, Italy
 Dead Vlei, Namibia
 Iguassu Falls, Brazil and Argentina
 Petra, Jordan
 College Fjord, Alaska, USA
 Karnak Temple, Luxor, Egypt
 Rio de Janeiro, Brazil
 Taman Negara Rainforest, Malaysia
 Jaisalmer Fort, India
 Galápagos Islands, Ecuador
 Manhattan Island, New York, USA
 Lake Titicaca, Bolivia and Peru
 Monet's Garden, Giverny, France
 Ngorongoro Crater, Tanzania
 Santorini, Greece
 Drakensberg, South Africa
 Zanzibar, Tanzania
 Makalu, Himalayas, Nepal
 Great Barrier Reef, Australia
 Lhasa, Tibet
 Yangshuo, Gulin, China
 Dubrovnik, Croatia
 Ephesus, Turkey
 The Bund, Shanghai, China
 Samarkand, Uzbekistan
 Killary Harbour, Ireland
 Uluru, Australia
 Lalibela, Ethiopia

Travel books